Dennis Russ (born 5 June 1992) is a German football midfielder.

External links 
 
 

1992 births
Living people
German footballers
SC Freiburg II players
Association football midfielders
Würzburger Kickers players
FSV Frankfurt players
3. Liga players